Georges Antenen (20 December 1903 – 25 March 1979) was a Swiss cyclist. He competed in two events at the 1924 Summer Olympics. He was also the Swiss National Road Race champion in 1930 and 1933.

References

External links
 

1903 births
1979 deaths
Swiss male cyclists
Olympic cyclists of Switzerland
Cyclists at the 1924 Summer Olympics
People from La Chaux-de-Fonds
Sportspeople from the canton of Neuchâtel